Ma'am Darling: Ninety-Nine Glimpses of Princess Margaret is a 2017 book on the life of Princess Margaret, sister of Queen Elizabeth II, written by Craig Brown. It was published in the United States in 2018 as Ninety-Nine Glimpses of Princess Margaret.

The book consists of "essays, lists, catalogues, diaries, palace announcements, newspaper cuttings and interviews, as well as parodies".

The book won the 2018 James Tait Black Memorial Prize in the biography category. It was well received by literary critics, with review aggregator Bookmarks reporting zero negative and two mixed reviews among 14 total, indicating "rave" reviews.

Speaking in 2019, Princess Margaret's close friend and lady-in-waiting Anne Tennant, Baroness Glenconner, described Ma'am Darling as "that horrible book, we won't mention the name of the somebody who wrote it. I don't know why people want to rot her like that."

References

2017 non-fiction books
Farrar, Straus and Giroux books
Cultural depictions of the British Royal Family
Princess Margaret, Countess of Snowdon
Fourth Estate books